Walroy is an unincorporated community in Lafayette Parish, Louisiana, United States.

It is located near the intersection of US Hwy 90  and LA Hwy 728-2.

References

Unincorporated communities in Louisiana
Unincorporated communities in Lafayette Parish, Louisiana
Acadiana